Exmouth Gulf is a gulf in the north-west of Western Australia. It lies between North West Cape and the main coastline of Western Australia. It is considered to be part of the Pilbara Coast and Northwest Shelf, and the Carnarvon Basin geologic formation. It was named after Edward Pellew, 1st Viscount Exmouth by Phillip Parker King in 1818.

Environment
Exmouth Gulf is a rich marine environment. It is a nursery for humpback whales, dugong and turtles. The mangrove systems on the eastern margins are areas of high primary productivity feeding and restocking both the Gulf and the nearby Ningaloo Reef. 

A proposal for a system of solar salt evaporation ponds stretching more than  along the gulf's south-western coast has given rise to heated debate on possible environmental impacts on the area.

The Gulf and off-shore waters beyond the Ningaloo fringing reef are home to some of Australia's more significant sport fish including marlin, Spanish mackerel, and several sub-species of tuna.

The Gulf sustains one of Western Australia's largest prawn fisheries, managed by the Kailis Fishing Group, which operates under license from the Western Australian Government.

Birds
They have been identified by BirdLife International as a  Important Bird Area (IBA) because they support over 1% of the world populations of pied oystercatchers and grey-tailed tattlers, as well as being an important site for the restricted-range dusky gerygone. Another IBA is  Sunday Island, lying in the north of the Gulf near the Muiron Islands, which is an important nesting site for roseate terns.

See also
Exmouth Submarine Base

References

Further reading

 Western Australia. Dept. of Planning and Urban Development. (1992) Exmouth coastal strategy Department of Planning and Urban Development. Perth, W.A. : The Dept.  (pbk.)

Gulfs of Australia
Gascoyne
Coastline of Western Australia
Important Bird Areas of Western Australia
Pilbara Coast